Sulochana Chatterjee was a former Indian film actress, who worked as a character actor in Hindi and Bengali cinema, appearing in 93 films, most notably Aaja Sanam (1968), Jahan Sati Wahan Bhagwan (1965) and Veer Ghatotkach (1970).

Early life
Born in Chandranagar, Sulochana is the daughter of a military man and the family, five girls, including the late Kamla Chatterjee, and one boy.

Career
Sulochana Chatterjee started her career in Hindi films in the early 1940s with films like Shobha (1942), Paigham (1943), Vishwas (1943), Aina (1944) etc. She was mostly seen in supporting roles, but also played the leading part in few films including Veena (1948).

Filmography

References

External links
 
 Cineplot

Indian film actresses
Actresses in Hindi cinema
Actresses in Bengali cinema
20th-century Indian actresses
1928 births
1999 deaths